Dioscoro Lopez Umali (November 17, 1917 – July 1, 1992) was a Filipino agriculturalist and National Scientist of the Philippines awardee, known as "the Father of Philippine Plant Breeding." He was awarded several international honors and distinctions for his outstanding achievements and improvements of rice, corn and other economic plants. The International Rice Research Institute named a laboratory in his honor.

Umali died on July 1, 1992 at the Makati Medical Center.

References 

1917 births
1992 deaths
20th-century Filipino scientists
National Scientists of the Philippines
Agriculturalists